South Carolina Highway 207 (SC 207) is a  primary state highway in the state of South Carolina. It is entirely within the boundaries of Chesterfield County and serves to connect the city of Pageland, South Carolina to the city of Monroe, North Carolina via North Carolina Highway 207 (NC 207).

Route description

The entire route is two lanes and travels through mostly farmland.

History

The road was originally established in 1940 as a new primary route from Pageland to the North Carolina state line (exactly as it is today).  By 1942, it was extended southeast to SC 151. In 1948, it was decommissioned, but was recommissioned in 1949 after NC 207 was established.

Junction list

See also

References

External links

SC 207 at Virginia Highways' South Carolina Highways Annex

207
Transportation in Chesterfield County, South Carolina